Providence Place is an American shopping mall in Providence, Rhode Island. With  of gross leasable area, it has been the largest shopping mall in Rhode Island since it opened in 1999.
As of 2022, the mall is anchored by Macy's, and Boscov's, and features premier brands such as Abercrombie & Fitch, Adore Me, Brooks Brothers, Tiffany & Co., and Free People.

History
Providence Place opened in 1999 with original anchors Lord & Taylor, Filene's, and Nordstrom. Lord & Taylor was repositioned and shuttered entirely in June 2004. The space was later filled by JCPenney in February 2005. Filene's became Macy's in 2006.

In September 2015, JCPenney closed down as part of a company decision to close 40 stores nationwide. 

Throughout 2016, the mall would undergo major renovations. The area that JCPenney once took would be converted to parking, and a guidance system would be added in the garage to direct customers to open spots. Levels C, B, and A would be renamed to P1, P2, and P3. Levels 1M and 2M would become simply 1.5 and 2.5. Stateside Parking would be renamed to "North Garage", and Cityside Parking would be renamed to "South Garage".

On October 9, 2018, it was announced that Boscov's would replace Nordstrom, which would close on January 4 of the following year when its lease would expire.

On June 1, 2020, Providence Place suffered damage after people protesting the murder of George Floyd broke in and looted 12-18 stores.

Illegal Apartment

Michael Townsend, Adriana Yoto and six other artists covertly built an apartment in a  empty space in one of the mall's parking garages in 2003 after hearing an ad imagining living there and lived there for up to three weeks at a time while documenting mall life. A cinderblock wall was built to keep it under the radar. The apartment was burglarized at one point, with the PlayStation 2 being stolen. (Some sources report the security guards took it in an attempt to identify the occupants) It had no running water so the residents all used the mall bathrooms. Townsend was caught in 2007 after an artist from Hong Kong, Jaffa Lam, visited and they were detected by security guards. After the fully furnished apartment was discovered by mall security, Townsend, the head of the artists’ cooperative, was initially charged with breaking and entering but it was reduced to trespassing. The story received national attention. Prior to the discovery, he was planning on building a kitchen, install wooden flooring, as well as adding a second bedroom. He pleaded no contest to trespassing and was sentenced to probation on October 2, 2007. The mall trespassed him for life, giving him a map with a red line he cannot  cross.

Architecture
The mall was built on land previously occupied by a dirt parking lot called "Ray's Park & Lock." The proposed design was met by opposition from residents on the city's East Side; developers changed the initial design to fit better into the neighborhood. The new design included more red and yellow brick and turrets on the roof, to reflect Providence's industrial past.

The design of the mall was partly done by the architect Friedrich St. Florian. He also built the skybridge that connected the mall with the Omni Providence Hotel (formerly the Westin Hotel).

In total, Providence Place consists of fifteen levels. The lowest three are labeled P1-P3 (C-A). Level P1 consists of Parking-Only North Garage (Stateside), and Street Level Restaurants Cityside. There is also a level D in the North Garage. Level P2 consists of DSW shoes and Restaurants, Old Navy stateside, Bed Bath & Beyond cityside and The Skybrige to the Westin. Level P3 consists of parking only, both cityside and stateside. Levels 1.5 and 2.5 also consist of parking only, both cityside and stateside. Cityside is the mall's southern end, facing Downtown. Stateside is the mall's northern end, facing state office buildings including the State Capitol.

The fifth through ninth levels are labeled 1, 1.5 (1M), 2, 2.5 (2M) and 3, which feature the indoor galleria (excluding the .5 levels). There is a Dave & Buster's, an IMAX theatre, and a 16-screen Showcase Cinemas on the seventh level. The mall also hosts two large parking garages labeled North Garage and South Garage, one stateside and the other cityside, anchored to its back end. Bridges connect the two sides over the Woonasquatucket River.

The mall's Winter Garden is a noticeable architectural feature. The four-level structure in the center of the mall spans the Woonasquatucket River and Amtrak's Northeast Corridor line. The area features large expanses of glass providing views of the city. The third level of the Winter Garden contains the food court and access to its fourth level, serving as the entrance to Dave and Buster's, the IMAX theater, and the cinema. Although not directly connected to the mall, Amtrak's Providence Station is located approximately 200 yards east of the mall, providing Acela Express and Northeast Regional service to Boston, New York City, and Washington, D.C.

List of anchor stores

Gallery

References

External links 
Official site

Brookfield Properties
Shopping malls in Rhode Island
Shopping malls established in 1999
Buildings and structures in Providence, Rhode Island
Tourist attractions in Providence, Rhode Island
1999 establishments in Rhode Island